The Manor, also known as Spelling Manor, is a mansion on Mapleton Drive in the Holmby Hills neighborhood of Los Angeles, California, across the street from Holmby Park. Constructed in 1988 for television producer Aaron Spelling, it is the second largest house in the Los Angeles metropolitan area. It was subsequently owned by British heiress Petra Ecclestone, daughter of Formula One racing magnate Bernie Ecclestone. Ecclestone purchased the home in 2011 for $85 million after it had been on the market for two years with an asking price of $150 million, making it the most expensive residential real estate listing in the US at the time. In June 2019 it was sold for $119.7 million, a new record as the highest in California's history.

Description
The Manor is a 56,500-square-foot (5,250 m2) French chateau-style mansion with 123 rooms (including 27 bathrooms and 14 bedrooms) on five acres of land.  Aaron Spelling, widely known as the television producer of series including Dynasty, Charlie's Angels, The Love Boat, Fantasy Island, 7th Heaven, Melrose Place, Beverly Hills, 90210 and Charmed, built it as his private residence.

Designed by architects James Langenheim & Associates and built in 1988 at a cost of $12 million, the two-storey house has an exterior of imported limestone, is 51.5 ft high, has a basement, and has an intermediate level for closets between the second storey and the attic. Candy Spelling and her interior designer traveled to Europe to buy fixtures and art for the home. When first built, it included a screening room, a gym, a room for Candy's doll collection, a basement bowling alley, a gift-wrapping and flower-cutting rooms, a barbershop, a humidity-controlled storage room, four two-car garages, a tennis court, and a pool. A long winding driveway leads to a circular granite motor court, fountain and space for 100 cars; there are also 16 carports.

History 
The Spellings purchased the former Bing Crosby Estate in 1983, razing the mansion that previously occupied the site, which was built in 1932 by Gordon Kaufmann and later owned by Bing Crosby. 

Construction began in 1986, with over 150 workers a day, using over 500 tons of steel, and was completed in 1991. The name The Manor was chosen by daughter Tori. Candy and interior designer Robert Dally spent 8 years buying furnishing from England, Italy, and France, including all of house's fireplaces, chanderliers, and sconces. The grand staircase in the entrance hall was inspired by Twelve Oaks in Gone with the Wind. The staircase is a single piece of metal, made in Texas.

The Manor is as big as a football field, and bigger than The White House, and has 2 driveways. During planning stages, Aaron removed an entire planned additional wing as a cost-saving measure. Not understanding blueprints, Candy advised in 2011 she would not have built the house as big had she realised the scale in person. Originally there was a zoo planned for daughter Tori. However, by the time the house neared completion Tori was aged 17, negating the need for it.  

Spelling died in the mansion on June 23, 2006, from complications of a stroke, at age 83.  The house was discussed in his obituary:

Mr. Spelling himself, though a self-effacing and extremely shy man in private, put his own vast wealth on display in the late 1980s when he and his wife, Candy, supervised the construction of their home in the Holmby Hills section of Los Angeles. It was said to include a bowling alley, an ice rink and an entire wing devoted to his wife's wardrobe.

After finally making the decision to sell in 2009, in the summer of 2011, five years after her husband's death, Candy Spelling put the estate up for sale, calling it the "greatest entertainment house ever" with a "kitchen where you can cook for two or 800".  In her 18 years living at The Manor, Spelling recalled, "All the stars came through, Prince Rainier, Prince Charles, Jackie Kennedy—every star from every one of Aaron's shows."

The house was sold for $85 million to Formula One heiress Petra Ecclestone. Immediately after taking possession of it in June 2011, she overhauled the house's design, hiring designer Gavin Brodin to undertake the $20 million project, which included removing the chandeliers, wall lights and fireplace mantels. After a three-week design period, it took approximately 500 workers nine weeks to install the new furnishings Ecclestone had chosen. In 2016, she decided to sell the property, and it was on and off the market for three years. 

In October 2016, the Manor was relisted with Rick Hilton and David Kramer of Hilton & Hyland with an asking price of $200 million. In February 2017, it was reported that singer Beyoncé and her husband Hip-hop mogul Jay Z had secretly visited it.

In June 2019, it sold for $119.7 million, a new California record. Originally priced at $200 million, it was eventually dropped to $160 million, then sold in early July 2019 for a record $120 million to Canadian multi-billionaire Daryl Katz, owner of the Edmonton Oilers ice hockey team.

In February 2022, it listed for $165 million. 

As of 2023, The Manor is still listed, though at a decreased price of $155 Million.

Features
The grand foyer has a monochrome colour scheme with a sweeping double staircase, black and white marble flooring, a crystal floating castle chandelier and Renaissance-style paintings.

The formal living room is a vast white-on-white space with three separate seating areas, an open marble fireplace and a grand piano.

The second living room is less formal and is decorated in a cool grey palette.  The original bookcases have been swapped for two aquariums and a bar. It has twin French doors.

The formal dining room has a monochrome colour scheme.  A 20-seater dining table sits below a low-hanging crystal chandelier crowned by a black ceiling rose.  French doors lead to the expansive gardens.

The master suite has 7,000 sq ft of living space and includes a kitchen, a living room, his and hers closets and bathrooms and a bedroom decorated in black, white and grey.

A massive bathroom with a soaking tub, cove ceiling and three wall-length vanity mirrors makes up just one of the home’s 27 bathrooms.

The beauty salon, which once housed Candy Spelling's doll collection, has a monochromatic colour scheme.

The cinema has 20 custom theatre seats spread over two tiers with carpeted flooring, a coffered ceiling and a movie screen that rises from the floor.

The basement is designed to resemble a nightclub with a bar, a pool room and a two-lane bowling alley.

Other notable features include two walk-in closets, a gigantic kitchen, a granite motor court for 100 cars, a solarium, a wine cellar, a game room, a gym and tanning rooms.

Controversy and critical reception
At the time of its construction, the project spawned a controversy over its massive size and ostentatious architecture.  In April 1988, the Los Angeles Times asked:

What's bigger than a football field, smaller than Hearst Castle, has a bowling alley and an entire floor of closets, and is making some people very annoyed? Aaron and Candy Spelling's  mansion in Holmby Hills. The French chateau, under construction now for two years, has turned the corner of Mapleton and Club View drives into a gawker's paradise. Sprawled across  on what once was the Bing Crosby estate, the house dwarfs the sizable mansions on the block and looms large over tranquil Holmby Park near Wilshire Boulevard.

After its completion, Los Angeles Times architecture critic Sam Hall Kaplan panned the home as one of the region's worst built in the 1980s.

In popular culture
People magazine ran a feature on the massive home. Performer John Perry composed a calypso/rap novelty song about the house, "The Ballad of Aaron and Candy (An Ode to Spelling's Dwelling)", including these lyrics:

See Candy's jewels, see Aaron's money,
Aaron doesn't think being picked on is funny.
See Candy's clothes, see Aaron's pad
See Aaron and Candy's castle make the neighbors mad.
But they're livin' in splendor high above the crowds
60,000 square feet of heaven.
That's Spelling's dwelling, I said
Spelling's Dwelling....

In the movie Legally Blonde, Elle Woods (Reese Witherspoon) described her social standing to Warner Huntington III (Matthew Davis): "I grew up in Bel Air , Warner. Across the street from Aaron Spelling."

In the sitcom Will & Grace, several episodes of season five make reference to "a gift-wrapping room like Candy Spelling has".

In episode 622, "Angels Revenge", of the movie-mocking TV series Mystery Science Theater 3000, Aaron Spelling's house passes by the Satellite of Love during one host segment, causing the host characters to pause in awe of the enormous sight.

See also 
 List of largest houses in the Los Angeles Metropolitan Area
 List of largest houses in the United States

Notes

References

Houses in Los Angeles
Holmby Hills, Los Angeles
Spelling family residences
Ecclestone family
Châteauesque architecture in the United States